Edward Hoehn is an American former tennis player.

Hoehn was raised in Hanover, New Hampshire, and won state high school championships for singles and doubles in both 1957 and 1958. He played collegiate tennis for the University of North Carolina, where he was team captain for two years and twice won the ACC doubles championships. 

In the 1960s he featured in the singles main draw of the US Championships/Open five times.

A resident of Vermont since 1968, Hoehn runs the Windridge Tennis & Sports Camps. He is a member of the Vermont Sports Hall of Fame (2014) and New England Hall of Fame (1992).

References

External links
 
 

Year of birth missing (living people)
Living people
American male tennis players
North Carolina Tar Heels men's tennis players
People from Hanover, New Hampshire
Tennis people from New Hampshire